Danger Society: The Young Bond Dossier is a non-fiction companion to the Young Bond series of novels written by Charlie Higson. The book contains in-depth character profiles to the cars, the weapons and the exotic locations, plus facts, statistics, photographs, maps, and illustrations by Kev Walker. The book also includes an original Young Bond short story by Charlie Higson titled "A Hard Man to Kill". The story is set between the books Hurricane Gold and By Royal Command and involves James Bond travelling back to London aboard the French ocean liner SS Colombie. It is the longest James Bond short story yet written. An extract from the story appeared in the paperback edition of By Royal Command.

Danger Society: The Young Bond Dossier was released by Puffin Books on 29 October 2009.

Official summary
Puffin Books promotional blurb

See also
 Outline of James Bond

References

External links
 Official Young Bond website
 The Young Bond Dossier - Official Young Bond news source

2009 non-fiction books
Young Bond novels
Non-fiction books about James Bond
Puffin Books books